The 2016 United States presidential election in North Carolina held on Tuesday, November 8, 2016, as part of the 2016 United States presidential election in which all 50 states plus the District of Columbia participated. North Carolina voters chose electors to represent them in the Electoral College via a popular vote, pitting the Republican Party's nominee, businessman Donald Trump, and running mate Indiana Governor Mike Pence against Democratic Party nominee, former Secretary of State Hillary Clinton, and her running mate Virginia Senator Tim Kaine. North Carolina has 15 electoral votes in the Electoral College.

Trump won the state with 49.83% of the vote, a small decrease from Mitt Romney's vote percentage in 2012. However, he won by a margin of 3.66%, an increase of 1.62% compared to Romney's margin in 2012. In contrast, Clinton obtained 46.17% of the vote, a decrease of over 2% in 2012 when Obama won 48.35% of the vote. Although both candidates saw decreases in vote share compared to 2012, Trump and Clinton both obtained more votes than the previous election's candidates due to a higher voter turnout in this election. Trump flipped seven counties to the Republican column and was the first Republican to win Robeson, Richmond, and Gates Counties since Richard Nixon in 1972. Clinton flipped just one county to the Democratic column, Watauga County, home to Boone.

Trump became the first Republican to win the White House without carrying Watauga County since James A. Garfield in 1880, as well as the first to do so without carrying Bumcombe or Forsyth Counties since Calvin Coolidge in 1924, the first to do so without carrying Wake County since Dwight D. Eisenhower in 1956, and the first to do so without carrying Pitt or Wilson Counties since Richard Nixon in 1968. It was also the first time since 1980 that North Carolina voted more Democratic than Ohio.

Primary elections 
The Democratic, Republican, and Libertarian primaries were on March 15, 2016. In North Carolina, registered members of each party only voted in their party's primary, while voters who were unaffiliated chose any one primary in which to vote.

Democratic primary 

Four candidates appeared on the Democratic presidential primary ballot:
Martin O'Malley (withdrawn)
Bernie Sanders
Hillary Clinton
Rocky De La Fuente

Polling
According to a WRAL-TV/SurveyUSA poll conducted the week before the primary: "[Hillary] Clinton holds a commanding lead of 57% to 34% among likely Democratic voters over U.S. Sen. Bernie Sanders of Vermont."

Results

Republican primary 

Twelve candidates appeared on the Republican presidential primary ballot:
Jeb Bush (withdrawn)
Ben Carson (withdrawn)
Chris Christie (withdrawn)
Ted Cruz
Carly Fiorina (withdrawn)
Jim Gilmore (withdrawn)
Mike Huckabee (withdrawn)
John Kasich
Rand Paul (withdrawn)
Marco Rubio
Rick Santorum (withdrawn)
Donald Trump

Polling
According to a WRAL-TV/SurveyUSA poll conducted the week before the primary: "[Donald] Trump tops U.S. Sen. Ted Cruz of Texas 41% to 27% among likely GOP voters. U.S. Sen. Marco Rubio of Florida and Ohio Gov. John Kasich trail far behind, at 14% and 11%, respectively."

Results

Trump managed to pull off a closer than expected win due to both Cruz and his campaigns performances in different metropolitan areas. Trump was strongest in the Charlotte, Fayetteville and Wilmington areas. Cruz did best in Greensboro, Asheville and the Research Triangle region, where North Carolina's major colleges and capital of Raleigh are located.

Libertarian primary 
Eleven candidates appeared on the Libertarian presidential primary ballot:
John David Hale
Cecil Ince
Gary Johnson
Steve Kerbel
Darryl W. Perry
Austin Petersen
Derrick Michael Reid
Jack Robinson, Jr.
Rhett Smith
Joy Waymire
Marc Allan Feldman

Results

General election

Predictions

Polling

Up until the summer of 2016, both Democrat Hillary Clinton and Republican Donald Trump were each winning polls, with Trump leading slightly. From late June 2016 to mid September 2016, Clinton gained momentum and had won most polls conducted in the summer. From mid September 2016 to late October, Clinton's momentum increased as she won every poll but one. The latest polls showed a near tie, with both almost evenly matched. The average of the final 3 polls showed Clinton ahead 46% to 45%. Interestingly, while she had a head-to-head lead in the last polls against Trump, polls with Gary Johnson showed the race a lot closer. The last New York Times poll conducted showed Trump and Clinton tied with 44% for each.

Candidates
In addition to Clinton, Johnson and Trump, Green Party nominee Jill Stein was granted write-in status by the North Carolina State Board of Elections, the only write-in candidate to qualify.

Results

By county

Counties that flipped from Democratic to Republican 
Bladen (largest town: Elizabethtown)
Gates (largest town: Gatesville)
Granville (largest city: Oxford)
Martin (largest town: Williamston)
Nash (largest city: Rocky Mount)
Richmond (largest city: Rockingham)
Robeson (largest city: Lumberton)

Counties that flipped from Republican to Democratic
Watauga (largest town: Boone)

By congressional district
Trump won 10 of 13 congressional districts.

Analysis

Prior to the 2016 election, North Carolina had been a Republican stronghold since 1968 with the state voting Democratic only once between then and 2008. In 2008, North Carolina voted Democratic for only the second time in 40 years. Although the state returned to the Republican column in 2012, when the party's nominee, Mitt Romney, carried the state, it did so only narrowly, cementing its new status as a battleground state. Throughout the 2016 campaign, North Carolina was considered by most a tossup state, with the outcome going into election night heavily debated. The Trump campaign saw winning North Carolina as crucial in order for Trump to win the Electoral College; conversely, the Clinton campaign felt that it was vital for them to win the state to block Trump's path to an Electoral College win. Both Trump and Clinton campaigned in the state shortly before the general election.

Despite winning the state, Trump, in some ways, under-performed in comparison to Romney in 2012. Romney won a majority of the vote in 2012 with 50.4% while Trump only managed a plurality of 49.8%. Similarly, Clinton also under-performed in comparison to Obama, with Clinton winning only 46.2% in comparison to Obama's 48.35%. This situation was the result of the spike in votes for third party candidates in the state as 4% of North Carolinians voted for a candidate other than the Democratic and Republican nominees in 2016 as opposed to just 1.26% in 2012.

An increase in turnout in North Carolina allowed both Trump and Clinton to out-perform Romney and Obama in terms of the total votes each candidate received. In 2016 Trump won around 92,000 more votes than Romney did in 2012 while Clinton won around 10,000 more than Obama. Furthermore, Trump also outperformed Romney by winning North Carolina by a greater margin than Romney was able to as Trump won the state over Clinton by 3.7% compared to the 2% margin Romney won over Obama. Trump's win in North Carolina marked the 9th time the state has voted Republican in the last 10 elections and, therefore, the state continues to lean more Republican at the presidential level.

See also 
Democratic Party presidential debates, 2016
Democratic Party presidential primaries, 2016
Republican Party presidential debates, 2016
Republican Party presidential primaries, 2016
Libertarian Party presidential primaries, 2016
2016 United States Senate election in North Carolina
2016 North Carolina gubernatorial election
2016 North Carolina elections

References

Further reading

External links
 North Carolina Bipartisan State Board of Elections and Ethics Enforcement
 North Carolina Democratic Party
 North Carolina Republican Party
 North Carolina Libertarian Party
 North Carolina Green Party
 RNC 2016 Republican Nominating Process 
 Green papers for 2016 primaries, caucuses, and conventions

Presidential
North Carolina
2016